The 2020 Rugby Football League Championship is a rugby league football competition played primarily in England but including a team from France.  It is the second tier of the three tiers of professional rugby league in England, below Super League and above League 1. Following rule changes agreed at the end of the 2018 season, the Super 8's format was abandoned and the Championship was to have featured a play-off system leading to promotion to Super League for one club while results during the regular season would have led to relegation to League 1 for two teams.

The 2020 Championship comprised 14 teams, which all played one another twice in the regular season, once at home and once away, totalling 26 games. The 2020 season would also have featured the "Summer Bash Weekend" for a sixth time so the regular season totals 27 games for each team.

On 16 March the structure and timing of the competition were placed in doubt as all rugby league games were suspended until 3 April at least as part of the United Kingdom's response to the coronavirus pandemic.  The suspension of the season was extended to indefinite.

A discussion between the RFL and club officials in May saw a majority of the Championship clubs reject a suggestion that the season could recommence with games being played behind closed doors.  The RFL board met on 20 July and having consulted with the clubs decided to abandon the 2020 season as the majority of clubs did not support playing behind closed doors. The RFL also confirmed that there would be no promotion or relegation between the Championship and Super League in 2020 and the season was declared null and void.

Teams
The Championship is made up of 14 teams, 11 of whom featured in the 2019 Championship; one, London Broncos, who were relegated from Super League; and two, Whitehaven and Oldham, who won promotion from League 1 in 2019. At the end of the 2019 season Bradford Bulls moved out of their Odsal ground and for 2020 agreed a ground share deal with Dewsbury Rams at the Rams' Tetley's Stadium.

Regular season results

Round 1

Round 2

Round 3

Round 4

Round 5

Standings at time of abandonment

References

Rugby Football League Championship
2020 in English rugby league
2020 in French rugby league
RFL Championship